Zetland Glacier is a small hanging glacier on the southern slopes of Mount Alexandra in Denton Hills, Scott Coast. The glacier terminates on the cliffs north of Colleen Lake. The name, applied by New Zealand Geographic Board (NZGB) in 1994, is taken from an old spelling for the Shetland Islands of Scotland.

Glaciers of Scott Coast